New Power may refer to:

New Power (company), Chinese company, a subsidiary of Zotye
New Power Party, political party in Taiwan